Losoya is an unincorporated community in Bexar County, Texas, United States.

It may also refer to:
Toribio Losoya (1808–1836), Mexican soldier
Statue of Toribio Losoya, a statue dedicated to him
Paula Losoya Taylor (died 1902), one of the founders of San Felipe Del Rio in Texas

See also
Lozoya (disambiguation)

Spanish-language surnames